Treherbert railway station serves the village of Treherbert in Rhondda Cynon Taf, Wales.

History
A station was first opened on this site by the Taff Vale Railway on 12 January 1863, and was the connecting point of the Rhondda and Swansea Bay Railway with the collieries of the Rhondda Fawr via a 1-mile 1683 yard tunnel (completed in 1890) which was one of the longest in South Wales. The TVR had opened its Rhondda Fawr branch from Dinas (north of ) in 1856 (to serve the Marquess of Bute's newly opened colliery) and began running passenger trains to the town seven years later.

A replacement bus service then operated to Cymmer until the L&O route was formally closed to passenger traffic in June 1970. The tracks northwards remained in use for mineral traffic to the collieries at Blaenrhondda until 1978, but have since been lifted.

The TVR route towards Porth was singled in stages between 1972 and 1981 (with the portion from here as far as Cwmparc signal box the first to be so treated) and today only one platform remains. There is no longer a run round loop still in existence north of the station (part of the old line to Cymmer Afan). There are four carriage sidings for the Transport for Wales DMU fleet (several of which are stabled & serviced here overnight & at weekends).

Services 
The basic service pattern on the route provides a departure every 30 minutes during the day Mondays to Saturdays, dropping to hourly in the evening. On 20 July 2018, previous franchise operator Arriva Trains Wales announced a trial period of extra Sunday services on the Rhondda Line to Cardiff and Barry Island. This was in response to a survey by Leanne Wood and the success of extra Sunday services on the Merthyr Line and the Rhymney Line. Services are operated using Class 150 Diesel Multiple Units.

References

Bibliography

External links 

Railway stations in Rhondda Cynon Taf
DfT Category F1 stations
Former Taff Vale Railway stations
Railway stations in Great Britain opened in 1863
Railway stations served by Transport for Wales Rail